Two ships and a shore establishment of the Royal Navy have borne the name HMS Fortitude:

Ships
  was a 74-gun third rate launched in 1780. She became a prison ship in 1795, a powder hulk in 1802, and was broken up in 1820.
 HMS Fortitude was launched in 1807 as the 74-gun third-rate . She became a prison ship in 1830, was renamed Fortitude in 1833, and was sold in 1870.

Shore establishments
  was the naval base at Ardrossan, commissioned in 1940 and paid off in 1945.
 HMS Fortitude II was the Coastal Forces base at Ardrossan, commissioned in 1941. The base was on the navy list in 1944, but not in 1942.

See also
 , launched in 1780 as a British East Indiaman
 , launched in 1842 transported immigrants to Brisbane in 1848–1849, for which Fortitude Valley is named

Royal Navy ship names